EdgeWork was a small press magazine published by Atlas Games starting in 1994 that was devoted to the role-playing game Over the Edge.

Publication history
EdgeWork was a fanzine for the surreal role-playing game Over the Edge. It was first published in 1994, and lasted for four issues. The last issue also appeared in 1994.

Reception
In the May 1994 edition of Dragon (Issue #205), Rick Swan reviewed the first issue, and admitted "I’m a sucker for fanzines. What they lack in polish, they usually make up in spunk, and EdgeWork, devoted to the eccentric Over the Edge game, is no exception." He concluded, "EdgeWork may have the editorial budget of a school newspaper, but for OTE enthusiasts, it’s more essential than the New York Times."

References

Defunct magazines published in the United States
Hobby magazines published in the United States
Magazines established in 1994
Magazines disestablished in 1994
Role-playing game magazines